Ankur Warikoo is an Indian YouTuber, entrepreneur and author. He is the former CEO of Groupon India, co-founder & former CEO of Nearbuy.

Early life and education
Ankur Warikoo was born on 25 August 1980 in New Delhi to Kashmiri Pandit parents from Srinagar. Warikoo received his bachelor's degree in Physics from Hindu College, Delhi. He received his MBA from Indian School of Business. He enrolled for a PhD in astrophysics and then later dropped out from Michigan State University.

Career
Warikoo started his career in 2008 by co-founding his first startup Accentium Web, under which websites like Gaadi.com and Secondshaadi.com were run. In 2011, he became the CEO of Groupon India. In 2015, he became the CEO of Nearbuy.com. In 2019, he stepped down from Nearbuy.com. In 2021, he published his first book Do Epic Shit.

Books
 xgdf c (2021)

Awards
Fortune 30 under 30
Golden Book Awards Winner 2022

References

Living people
Kashmiri people
Kashmiri Pandits
Indian people of Kashmiri descent
Indian company founders
Indian Internet company founders
20th-century Indian businesspeople
1980 births